John Bowie may refer to:
John Bowie (American football) (born 1984), American football player
John Bowie, prisoner on the ship St. Michael of Scarborough
John Bowie Sr. (1688–1759), Scottish-born colonist in Maryland
John Bowie (publisher) (died 1815), Scottish musician and music publisher
John Hamilton Bowie (born 1938), Australian chemist
John Ross Bowie (born 1971), American actor and comedian